Rexford G. Newcomb (April 24, 1886 – March 16, 1968) was an American architectural historian.

Biography
Newcomb was born in Independence, Kansas, on April 24, 1886. After undergraduate study at the University of Kansas, he earned both a second bachelor's degree in architecture and a master's in architecture at the University of Illinois, and a master of arts at the University of Southern California. He married Ruth Bergen on October 24, 1911 in Wichita, Kansas; they had three children.

After stints teaching at the Long Beach Polytechnic High School and Long Beach Evening High School, University of Southern California and Texas A&M University, Newcomb returned to the University of Illinois as a faculty member in 1918.  He remained there until 1954.  He served as dean of the College of Fine and Applied Arts from 1932 to 1954. He was also the second president of the Society of Architectural Historians.

Newcomb died on March 16, 1968, at Princeton, Illinois.

Recognition
Newcomb was elected a Fellow of the American Institute of Architects in 1940, and a Fellow of the American Association for the Advancement of Science in 1928. His book Architecture of the Old Northwest Territory was the 1950 winner of the Alice Davis Hitchcock Award.

Newcomb's collected papers are held by the University of Illinois library system.

Selected books
  Reprinted by Dover Publications in 1973, .
 . Republished as Outlines of the History of Architecture in four separate volumes by John Wiley & Sons, Inc., 1931–1939.
 
 
 
 
 
  Reprinted by Dover Publications in 1990.

References

1886 births
1968 deaths
American architectural historians
University of Kansas alumni
University of Illinois School of Architecture alumni
University of Illinois Urbana-Champaign faculty
University of Southern California faculty
Texas A&M University faculty
American university and college faculty deans
Fellows of the American Institute of Architects
Fellows of the American Association for the Advancement of Science
Historians from Texas
Historians from California
20th-century American academics